Yankee Hill, California may refer to:
Yankee Hill, Butte County, California
Yankee Hill, Tuolumne County, California